Geneviève Racette (born August 31, 1990) is a singer-songwriter from Montreal, Quebec.

Biography 
Originally from Dorval, Racette is a bilingual singer-songwriter. She started singing at the age of 8 and got her first guitar at 11. She is the daughter of two parents who are musicians and have studied music. Her mother is a classically trained pianist and her father is a music lover and self-taught guitarist.

Her first EP, "Geneviève Racette", was released in May 2014 and earned her a nomination for the Sirius XM Indies Awards (2015) "Francophone Artist of the Year (Emerging)". Her first full-length album "Les aurores boréales" was released in May 2016, and where picked up by several Canadian radio stations, including Ici Musique, Sirius XM and more than 40 other stations.

In 2017, Geneviève opened on tour for Valérie Carpentier and François Lachance. That same year, she was chosen from among 150 artists to participate in the Banff Centre for Arts and Creativity's singer-songwriter residency, to work on her songs with some of Nashville's most renowned creators. After a busy summer season with the ROSEQ "Découverte" tour in 2017, Geneviève launches a mini-album project of English-language covers simply entitled "Covers".

In 2019, she returned to the Banff Center for Arts and Creativity to work on the pre-production of her album, "No Water, No Flowers". This first English-language album enabled Geneviève to win the Emerging Artist of the Year award at the Canadian Folk Music Awards (2020). Several songs from this album are featured on numerous editorial playlists on Apple Music, Spotify and Amazon Music and are in the top 10 of Ici Musique on Sirius XM.

She catches the attention of singer-songwriter Dallas Green on Instagram with her cover of Hello, I'm in Delaware. He then invited her to perform with him on stage at the 2019 Osheaga Festival.

The concert tour that followed the release of the album "No Water, No Flowers" brought Geneviève to perform on Canadian stages from coast to coast, playing over a hundred Canadian venues. Racette has expanded her performance territory from primarily Quebec venues to other Canadian provinces: Manitoba, Saskatchewan and the Maritimes, headlining each tour. Osheaga, Home Routes – Chemin chez nous, Canadian Music Week (2019), Folk Music Ontario (2019), Folk Alliance International (2020), are just a few of the events in which the artist participated in 2019 and 2020.

In May 2021 she released the single Maybe and in September 2021 the single Les adieux. In March 2022 Geneviève releases her third LP, Satellite.

Discography

References

External links 

1990 births
Canadian women singer-songwriters
Songwriters from Quebec
Canadian women guitarists
French-language singers of Canada
Living people
People from Dorval
Singers from Quebec
Canadian women record producers
21st-century Canadian women singers